The Headwaters School, formerly Khabele School until 2016, is an early childhood through 12th grade private school located in Austin, Texas. It re-branded as Headwaters School in 2016. It begins with a Montessori foundation and progresses to the International Baccalaureate Diploma Programme.  It has three campuses, with the Middle & High School Campus in Downtown Austin serving grades 6 through 12, the Elementary Campus on Brodie Lane serving grades Kindergarten through 5, and the Early Childhood Campus on Manchaca Road serving ages 18 months through preschool.

History
Letsie "Khotso" Khabele, Jennifer "Moya" Khabele, Lisa Dubuque, and Hector Perez co-founded the school. Khotso Khabele is the grandson of Bertha Sadler Means, an Austin activist during the Civil Rights Movement. Michael Barnes of the Austin American-Statesman said that "[t]he idea for the school grew out of a national crisis". Khotso Khabele said he considered "How do I raise my child in this new world? How do I educate kids for this new, rapidly changing world? We got clear that we wanted to lean into change."

The school opened in 2001 with 9 students. The Khabele couple had started the school six months after the two first met. The school initially used a borrowed classroom, in North Austin. In 2007 the school acquired an annex at 701 W. 7th St. and housed dance, martial arts, music, and yoga classes there. In 2008 the school had 170 students.

In 2011 Khabele merged with Primavera Montessori, a South Austin private school for 18-month-old to 1st grade children. Primavera; established by Maria Claus, John Martin, Jennifer Phillips, and Jennifer Tyson; had opened in October 2002, with 15 students. As of 2012 the Khabele School had 101 employees and a yearly budget of $6 million. By 2012 it had signed a one-year lease for the facility that houses the elementary division. After that point, the school had the possibility of renewing the lease or constructing a new facility. As of January 2013 the school had three campuses with a total of 460 students. Barnes said in 2013 that the "globally themed" school had "grown rapidly".

In 2014, the former co-founders, Jennifer "Moya" Khabele, and Letsie James "Khotso" Khabele, were sued by the current leadership of charging the school two to three times the fair market value for its downtown location from 2006 to 2013. The suit claimed that the pair overcharged the school over $1 million dollars. "The school also wanted the Khabeles to repay rent overages, property taxes, capital improvement expenditures and personal expenses the school said the couple made." The upheaval began when the leadership of the newly merged schools began questioning the Khabele's financial decisions. Expenditures in question were the Khabele's nanny's salary, and private travel, which it was claimed was paid for by the school directly. The board treasurer was also named in the suit for allegedly covering up the Khabele's alleged theft. In 2014, "Khotso" Khabele founded Khabele + Strong Incubator [School] (now KoSchool) which The Khabele School stated in their lawsuit was confusing and damaging to the original school. The lawsuit was eventually settled by both parties.

Ted Graf became the head of school in July 2015. Its new name was effective 2016. Graf, the principal, stated that the school was planning to get a new name since the merger as it needed to solidify its identity. In regards to the new name Graf stated "We felt like Headwaters, metaphorically, was this notion that educational journeys of the self begin at this primal spot, and we felt like Headwaters and all the imagery and language that comes with it really expresses what we’re trying to do as a school."

Curriculum

The K-5th grade is Montessori.  The high school is part of the IBO program for juniors and seniors.

As of 2007, students at the school do charitable acts for one week in the month of December.

Student body
As of 2014 the school had 527 students, with 8% of the student body receiving financial aid. The enrollment includes 126 students in early childhood (18 months to 5 years), 173 students in elementary school (Kindergarten through grade 5), and 228 students in middle and high school (6-12). The school states that 8% of its total student body receives financial aid is given of its total student body. As of 2014 the middle and high school division includes 20 international students who originated from eight countries.

References

External links

 
 

Private K-12 schools in Texas
High schools in Austin, Texas
2001 establishments in Texas
Educational institutions established in 2001
Preparatory schools in Texas
Montessori schools in the United States